The name Gladys has been used for four tropical cyclones in the Atlantic Ocean.
 Hurricane Gladys (1955)
 Hurricane Gladys (1964)
 Hurricane Gladys (1968) – hit Cuba, Florida and Nova Scotia.
 Hurricane Gladys (1975)

The name Gladys has been also used for three tropical cyclones in the northwest Pacific Ocean.
 Typhoon Gladys (1947) (T4721)
 Typhoon Gladys (1991) (T9112, 14W) – Struck Japan and South Korea.
 Typhoon Gladys (1994) (T9417, 20W, Uding) – Struck Taiwan.

Atlantic hurricane set index articles
Pacific typhoon set index articles